= Bowling at the 2010 South American Games – Men's four players team =

The Men's fours event at the 2010 South American Games was held on March 27 at 11:30.

== Medalists ==
Gold	Silver	Bronze
Manuel Otalora; Andrés Gómez; Jaime González; David Romero; Colombia	Danny Fung Sun; Rafael Eduardo Medina; Luis Richard Olivo; Ildemaro Ricardo Ruiz; Venezuela	Sebastian Montalbetti; Ricardo Javier Rosa; Jonathan Ariel Hocsman; Christian Dalmasso Bonnet; Argentina

== Results ==
Rank	Team	Athlete	Games						Total	Avg	Grand
Rank	Team	Athlete	G1	G2	G3	G4	G5	G6	Total	Avg	Grand
1st place, gold medalist(s)	Colombia	Jaime González (COL)	211	188	194	233	245	202	1273	212.2	4750
1st place, gold medalist(s)	Colombia	David Romero (COL)	228	203	179	198	190	174	1172	195.3	4750
1st place, gold medalist(s)	Colombia	Andrés Gómez (COL)	177	214	177	186	202	179	1135	189.2	4750
1st place, gold medalist(s)	Colombia	Manuel Otalora (COL)	195	227	172	201	185	190	1170	195.0	4750
2nd place, silver medalist(s)	Venezuela	Rafael Eduardo Medina (VEN)	185	224	210	184	188	234	1225	204.2	4642
2nd place, silver medalist(s)	Venezuela	Danny Fung Sun (VEN)	198	176	183	233	182	174	1146	191.0	4642
2nd place, silver medalist(s)	Venezuela	Luis Richard Olivo (VEN)	162	169	180	192	226	170	1099	183.2	4642
2nd place, silver medalist(s)	Venezuela	Ildemaro Ricardo Ruis (VEN)	209	190	236	202	160	175	1172	195.3	4642
3rd place, bronze medalist(s)	Argentina	Ricardo Javier Rosa (ARG)	146	198	170	173	204	175	1066	177.7	4205
3rd place, bronze medalist(s)	Argentina	Jonathan Ariel Hocsman (ARG)	210	128	173	176	144	189	1020	170.0	4205
3rd place, bronze medalist(s)	Argentina	Sebastian Montalbetti (ARG)	176	177	177	164	214	183	1091	181.8	4205
3rd place, bronze medalist(s)	Argentina	Christian Fernando Dalmasso (ARG)	196	164	154	196	180	138	1028	171.3	4205
4	Brazil	Juliano Oliveira (BRA)	157	221	225	167	207	161	1138	189.7	4175
4	Brazil	Walter Costa (BRA)	179	165	167	143	164	148	966	161.0	4175
4	Brazil	Charles Robini (BRA)	174	147	174	184	179	137	995	165.8	4175
4	Brazil	Marcio Vieira (BRA)	193	187	161	196	168	171	1076	179.3	4175
5	Chile	Harold Andrés Pickering (CHI)	196	189	159	143	183	156	1026	171.0	4103
5	Chile	Luis Felipe Gonzalez (CHI)	198	160	200	146	203	161	1068	178.0	4103
5	Chile	Adrian Reyes Vargas (CHI)	157	204	189	152	171	170	1043	173.8	4103
5	Chile	Pablo Alejandro Pohl (CHI)	156	171	158	200	132	149	966	161.0	4103
6	Aruba	Nelson Kelly (ARU)	170	170	179	168	156	180	1023	170.5	4103
6	Aruba	Errol Brown (ARU)	189	193	191	166	147	168	1054	175.7	4103
6	Aruba	Jason Odor (ARU)	150	236	176	142	194	151	1049	174.8	4103
6	Aruba	Laurence Wilming (ARU)	200	151	150	198	148	130	977	162.8	
7	Bolivia	Pablo Hinojosa Rojas (BOL)	203	200	164	172	173	138	1050	175.0	4018
7	Bolivia	Sebastian Nemtala Garcia (BOL)	160	135	183	131	146	171	926	154.3	4018
7	Bolivia	Oscar Guillermo Candia (BOL)	176	178	189	178	160	152	1033	172.2	4018
7	Bolivia	Ignacio Rojas Patino (BOL)	157	173	148	198	163	170	1009	168.2	4018
10	Netherlands Antilles	Carlos Finx (AHO)	190	150	188	160	168	170	1026	171.0	3947
10	Netherlands Antilles	Felix Ibañez (AHO)	188	179	139	167	193	127	993	165.5	3947
10	Netherlands Antilles	Emiel Samander (AHO)	225	220	137	162	152	173	1069	178.2	3947
10	Netherlands Antilles	Tarik Samander (AHO)	136	153	123	165	169	113	859	143.2	3947
9	Peru	Denis Richard Toyoda (PER)	155	123	124	171	157	126	856	142.7	3904
9	Peru	Eduardo Fujinaka (PER)	153	179	179	177	133	124	945	157.5	3904
9	Peru	Victor Ricardo Takechi (PER)	168	197	167	164	151	192	1039	173.2	3904
9	Peru	Adolfo Edgardo Chang (PER)	201	186	212	135	188	142	1064	177.3	3904
10	Paraguay	Alejandro Carricarte (PAR)	170	159	192	165	176	181	1043	173.8	3680
10	Paraguay	Jorge Luis Alarcon (PAR)	142	131	159	156	170	127	885	147.5	3680
10	Paraguay	Chieh Hsiao Tzu (PAR)	186	144	137	128	164	99	858	143.0	3680
10	Paraguay	Alejandro Ignacio Lopez (PAR)	157	146	169	111	183	128	894	149.0	3680
NR	Ecuador 2	Dioegenes Jose Borja (ECU)	199	184	182	221	203	184	1173	195.5	1173
NR	Ecuador 1	Jorge Luis Perez (ECU)	190	148	170	165	116	244	1033	172.2	1033
